Neelakanta or Nilakanta may refer to:

 Nilakanta (Hinduism), also known as Shiva
 Neelakanta (film), 2006 Indian Kannada language film
 Neelakanta (director), Indian Telugu film director.
 Nilakantha Somayaji (1444–1544), Indian mathematician and astronomer
 Nilakanta Sri Ram (1889–1973), Indian theosophist leader
 K. A. Nilakanta Sastri (1892–1975), Indian historian and Dravidologist
 T. N. Srinivasan (1933–2018), Indian economist